"Just the Way You Are (Drunk at the Bar)" is a song by the Irish singer Brian McFadden. The song was written and produced by McFadden and Robert Conley. The single was released on 24 February 2011, peaking at #49 on the ARIA Singles Chart. A video for the song was not released, as it was cancelled.

Criticism
The song has been criticised as a glorification of date rape. McFadden cancelled the shooting of a proposed pop video for the song. He asked that the song not be played on the radio and pledged via his Twitter account to donate all proceeds from the song to rape victims.

Chart performance
"Just the Way You Are (Drunk at the Bar)" debuted on the ARIA Singles Chart at number 61 on 8 March 2011, and peaked at number 49 the next week.

Track listing
 Australian Digital Download

Charts

References

2011 singles
Brian McFadden songs
Songs written by Brian McFadden
Songs written by Robert Conley (music producer)
2011 songs